The 1968 Copa Libertadores was the ninth edition of the Copa Libertadores, South America's premier association football competition. It was played between January 27 and May 16. A record 21 teams participated in this edition.

This edition brought the explosive debut of a humble team from the city of La Plata, capital of the Buenos Aires province, that did not find itself in the plateau of Argentine football. Estudiantes de La Plata, an authentic stranger in the highest levels of South American football, surpassed all expectations as they eliminated defending champions Racing and Independiente (two denominated "great" ones in Argentina as well as each having already won the tournament before).

With a talented prospect by the name of Juan Ramón Verón, the pincharatas beat Palmeiras 2–0 in a playoff after the final series finished 2–2 on points. Estudiantes conquered the title with an original style which emphasized athleticism and strategic preparation.

Qualified teams

Tie-breaking criteria
At each stage of the tournament teams receive 2 points for a win, 1 point for a draw, and no points for a loss. If two or more teams are equal on points, the following criteria will be applied to determine the ranking in the group stage:

a one-game playoff;
superior goal difference;
draw of lots.

First round
Twenty teams were drawn into five groups of four. In each group, teams played against each other home-and-away. The top two teams in each group advanced to the Second round. Racing, the title holders, had a bye to the Semifinals.

Group 1

Group 2

Group 3

Group 4

Group 5

Second round
Ten teams were drawn into three groups, two groups of three and one group of four. In each group, teams played against each other home-and-away. The top team in each group advanced to the Semifinals, along with Racing Club.

Group A

Group B

Group C

Semifinals
Four teams were drawn into two groups. In each group, teams played against each other home-and-away. The top team in each group advanced to the Finals.

Semifinal 1

Estudiantes progressed to the finals due to better goal difference.

Semifinal 2

Finals

Champion

Top goalscorers

Footnotes

A.  The match finished 1-1, but Jorge Wilstermann were declared 0-1 winners after Troncoso's own goal was declared invalid.
B.  The match finished 3-2, but the 2 points were awarded to Deportivo Portugués as Náutico made two substitutions.

External links
 Sitio oficial de la CONMEBOL
 RSSSF on the 1968 Copa Libertadores

1
Copa Libertadores seasons